Take Me To Town is a 1953 American Comedy Western film directed by Douglas Sirk and starring Ann Sheridan and Sterling Hayden.

Plot
On the lam after a robbery and needing a place to hide out, Vermilion O'Toole and her partner, Newt Cole, settle down in a new town.

Going by a new name, Mae Madison, the lady outlaw is surprised by three young boys who are looking for a new wife for their recently widowed dad, Will Hall. A complication or two arises when the new gal and Will begin to hit it off.

Cast
 Ann Sheridan as Vermilion O'Toole 
 Sterling Hayden as Will Hall
 Phillip Reed as Newton Cole
 Lee Patrick as Rose
 Lee Aaker as Corney 
 Harvey Grant as Petey
 Dustey Henley as Bucket 
 Larry Gates as Ed Daggett
 Forrest Lewis as Ed Higgins
 Phyllis Stanley as Mrs. Stoffer
 Dorothy Neumann as Felice Pickett
 Ann Tyrrell as Louise Pickett

Production
The film was Ross Hunter's first as a producer. The onetime actor was working as a teacher when Ann Sheridan suggested he turn to producing. He worked without salary at the Motion Picture Center to learn producing, then managed to set up the film Take Me to Town at Universal. Sheridan's normal price was $475,000 per film but she agreed to $100,000 to work with Hunter. "It was Annie who really gave me my first break," later recalled Hunter. "She was a very great lady."

In 1960, Hunter was reportedly working on a Broadway version Vermillion. It was never made.

References

External links
 
 
 

1953 films
1953 Western (genre) films
American Western (genre) films
Films directed by Douglas Sirk
Films produced by Ross Hunter
Films scored by Henry Mancini
Films scored by Herman Stein
Universal Pictures films
1950s English-language films
1950s American films